The sebae anemone (Heteractis crispa), also known as leathery sea anemone, long tentacle anemone, or purple tip anemone, is a species of sea anemone belonging to the family Stichodactylidae and native to the Indo-Pacific area.

It was first described in 1834 by Wilhelm Hemprich and Christian Gottfried Ehrenberg as Actinia crispa. The name accepted by the World Register of Marine Species is Radianthus crispa.

Description
The sebae anemone is characterized by a flared oral disc that reaches between 20 and 50 cm in diameter and with multiple and long tentacles measuring 10 to 15 cm. These tentacles have rounded tip and the end is often colored with a purple or blue spot. The column, external structure of an anemone visible when the animal is closed, is gray in color and dotted with sticky whitish "warts". The sea anemone, being member of the Hexacorallia, usually carries a number of tentacles multiple of six and they are positioned in concentric circles. These are light beige to purple.

Distribution and habitat
The sebae anemone is widespread throughout the tropical and subtropical waters of the Indo-Pacific area from the eastern coasts of Africa, Red Sea included, to Polynesia and from south Japan to Australia and New-Caledonia.

This sea anemone prefers hard base substrates slightly covered with sand but it can also cling to branching corals from the surface to 40 meters deep.

Biology
The sebae anemone has two ways to feed. The first one is through the inside via photosynthesis of its symbiotic hosts zooxanthellae, living in its tissues. And the second one is through a normal way by capturing its prey via its tentacles that allow it to immobilize its prey (small invertebrates, fry, or juvenile fish).

Its reproduction can be sexual by simultaneous transmission of male and female gametes in the water or asexual by scissiparity; the anemone divides itself into two separate individuals from the foot or the mouth.

The relationship between anemonefish and their host sea anemones is highly nested in structure.  With 15 species of hosted anemonefish, the sebae anemone is highly generalist, and mostly hosts generalist anemonefish.  A. latezonatus, the wide-band anemonefish, is a specialist only hosted by H. crispa.. In the Red Sea, it is considered a nursery anemone as sexually mature fish are rarely hosted by H. crispa. A study in the northern Red Sea found anemone density affected whether H. crispa hosted anemonefish, with clusters of juvenile fish only found at low-density sites, while either one or no juvenile anemonefish were found in H. crispa at the high-density site. The authors theorised that H. crispa was a nursery anemone due to being unable to adequately protect adult anemonefish from predation, active emigration of fish to Entacmaea quadricolor and/or environmentally controlled cessation of fish growth.  Why this would be so in the Red Sea is not clear, when in the western Pacific, adult pairs are found in individuals of H. crispa.

The anemone fish hosted by the sebae anemone are: 

Amphiprion akindynos (Barrier Reef anemonefish)
A. barberi (Barber's anemonefish) 
A. bicinctus (two-band anemonefish)
A. chrysopterus (orange-fin anemonefish)
A. clarkii (Clark's anemonefish)
A. ephippium (red saddleback anemonefish) 
A. latezonatus (wide-band anemonefish)
A. leucokranos (white-bonnet anemonefish)
A. melanopus (red and black anemonefish)
A. omanensis (Oman anemonefish)
A. percula (clown anemonefish)
A. perideraion (pink skunk anemonefish)
A. polymnus (saddleback anemonefish)
A. sandaracinos (orange anemonefish)
 A. thiellei 
A. tricinctus (three-band anemonefish)

Juveniles of  Dascyllus trimaculatus are also associated with H. crispa''.

Gallery
Anemonefish in H. crispa

Notes

References

External links
 
 

Stichodactylidae
Cnidarians of the Indian Ocean
Cnidarians of the Pacific Ocean
Marine fauna of Asia
Marine fauna of Oceania
Marine fauna of Southeast Asia
Anthozoa of Australia
Taxa named by Christian Gottfried Ehrenberg
Animals described in 1834
Taxa named by Wilhelm Hemprich